Drasteria hyblaeoides is a moth of the family Erebidae. It is found in Kyrghyzstan, Tadjikistan and China (Tibet, Qinghai).

References

Drasteria
Moths described in 1878
Moths of Asia